Charles Vincent Stockwood (29 June 1885 – 28 March 1958) was an  Anglican priest, the Archdeacon of Man from 1938 to 1958.

Born on 29 June 1885 he was educated at Cowbridge Grammar School and  St Catherine's College, Oxford.  Ordained in 1910 his first post was as a curate at All Saints, Camberwell after which he was Associate Secretary of the  Church Pastoral Society from 1914 to 1918. He was then Vicar of St Olave's Ramsey from 1918 to 1927 when he became Rural Dean of Douglas,  a post he held until his archdeacon’s appointment.

He died in post on 28 March 1958.

References

1885 births
People educated at Cowbridge Grammar School
Archdeacons of Man
1958 deaths